The Japan Warriors was a tennis team based in Japan which competed in the International Premier Tennis League (IPTL). It is fifth team to join the tennis league and  first participated at the 2015 season.

Current roster

  Maria Sharapova
  Kei Nishikori
  Vasek Pospisil
  Philipp Kohlschreiber
  Leander Paes
  Thomas Enqvist
  Marat Safin
  Daniela Hantuchová
  Lucas Pouille
  Kurumi Nara

References

International Premier Tennis League teams
Tennis in Japan
Sports clubs established in 2015
2015 establishments in Japan